The 2012 Super GT International Series Malaysia was the third round of the 2012 Super GT season. It took place on June 10, 2012.

Race results

Super GT International Series Malaysia
Super GT International Series Malaysia